The 1917 Paris–Tours was the 12th edition of the Paris–Tours cycle race and was held on 6 May 1917. The race started in Paris and finished in Tours. The race was won by Philippe Thys.

General classification

References

1917 in French sport
1917
May 1917 sports events